Sturmgeist is an experimental black/thrash metal band formed by Cornelius Jakhelln in 2002.

Biography

Beginnings
In 2002, Cornelius Jakhelln began working on a new band. The name chosen was Sturmgeist (Stormspirit in German). The music was an experimental mix of black/thrash metal with lyrics sung in English, Norwegian, and German about Germanic folklore, war, and recitations of Goethe poetry. On 24 January 2005 Sturmgeist released their first full-length, entitled Meister Mephisto on the record label, Season Of Mist.

Tour
In support of the album, Cornelius acquired the help of various musicians including Asgeir Mickelson of Borknagar and Spiral Architect fame, for a small European tour. The band played six shows in France, Belgium, England and Scotland, supporting the black metal band, Carpathian Forest.

Über
Starting in October, Sturmgeist began recording their sequel to Meister Mephisto in Børge Finstad's Top Room studios. The band was now no longer a solo band, with John "Panzer" Jacobsen, guitarist on the tour, now filling the position as an official guitarist in the band and Anti Christian of Tsjuder, Grimfist and The Cumshots fame playing drums on the new album. The album is entitled Über and was released on 16 October 2006 through Season Of Mist in Europe, and on October 17 in North America.

Members

Current line-up
 Cornelius Jakhelln (Solefald) - vocals, guitar, bass, keyboards/synthesizers, sampling

Live session musicians on the 2005 tour
 Panzer  - guitar
 Henrik Strømme aka Sturmrik Wilde - guitar
Asgeir Mickelson (Borknagar, Spiral Architect, Ihsahn, ex-Vintersorg, Scariot) - drums

Releases 
 Meister Mephisto (2005), on Season of Mist
 Über (2006), on Season of Mist
 Manifesto Futurista (2009)

External links 
 Sturmgeist Official Homepage
 Cornelius' Official Homepage
 Official Sturmgeist Myspace Page
 Official Sturmgeist page on Season Of Mist's website

Norwegian black metal musical groups
Norwegian thrash metal musical groups
Norwegian industrial metal musical groups
Musical groups established in 2002
2002 establishments in Norway
Norwegian musical trios
Season of Mist artists

Musical groups from Norway with local place of origin missing